Lorenzo Caccialanza (born January 28, 1955) is an Italian-born American football goalkeeper and actor.

Career

Football 
Caccialanza played for several years in the Italian leagues before moving to the United States to pursue an acting career.  In 1986, he played for the Hollywood Kickers when they won the Western Soccer Alliance championship.  Caccialanza was the league leading goalkeeper.

Caccialanza was an assistant coach with the Marlborough School in Los Angeles.

Acting 
As an actor, Caccialanza is best known for his work on the CBS prime time soap opera Knots Landing as Nick Schillace, the gigolo boyfriend of Anne Matheson (played by Michelle Phillips).  Caccialanza has also appeared on the daytime soap operas, Days of Our Lives and The Bold and the Beautiful. He played the Italian terrorist Marco in Die Hard.

Personal life
Jane Fonda dated Caccialanza for about six months beginning in 1989. She broke up with him and began a relationship with businessman Ted Turner in the middle of 1990.

Filmography

Film

Television

References

External links
 

1955 births
American male soap opera actors
American male television actors
Italian footballers
Italian emigrants to the United States
Living people
Footballers from Milan
Western Soccer Alliance players
Cologno Monzese
Association football goalkeepers